The Nedelin catastrophe or Nedelin disaster, known in Russia as the Catastrophe at Baikonur Cosmodrome, was a launch pad accident that occurred on 24 October 1960 at the Baikonur Cosmodrome in Soviet Kazakhstan. As a prototype of the R-16 intercontinental ballistic missile was being prepared for a test flight, an explosion occurred when the second stage engine ignited accidentally, killing an unknown number of military and technical personnel working on the preparations. Despite the magnitude of the disaster, information was suppressed for many years and the Soviet government did not acknowledge the event until 1989. 

The disaster is named after Chief marshal of Artillery Mitrofan Ivanovich Nedelin, who was killed in the explosion. As commanding officer of the Soviet Union's Strategic Rocket Forces, Nedelin was the head of the R-16 development program.

Launch preparations 
On 23 October 1960, the prototype R-16 intercontinental ballistic missile had been installed on launching pad 41 awaiting final tests before launch. The missile was over 30 m long, 3.0 m in diameter and had a launch weight of 141 tons. These risks were accounted for in the safety requirements of the launch procedures, but Nedelin's insistence on achieving a test launch ahead of the 7 November 1960 anniversary of the Bolshevik Revolution resulted in extreme schedule pressure, in a context of substantial emerging engineering difficulties. Ultimately pre-launch tests began to overlap with launch preparations.

Accident 
A short circuit in the replaced main sequencer caused the second-stage engine to fire while being tested before launch. This detonated the first stage fuel tanks directly below, destroying the missile in an enormous explosion. Before seeking refuge, the camera operator remotely activated automatic cameras set around the launching pad that filmed the explosion in detail. 

People near the rocket were instantly incinerated; those farther away were burned to death or poisoned by the toxic fuel component vapors. Andrei Sakharov described many details: as soon as the engine fired, most of the personnel there ran to the perimeter, but were trapped inside the security fence and then engulfed in the fireball of burning fuel. The explosion incinerated or asphyxiated Nedelin, a top aide, the USSR's top missile-guidance designer, and over 70 other officers and engineers. Still others died later of burns or poisoning. Missile designer Mikhail Yangel and the test range commanding officer survived only because he had left to smoke a cigarette behind a bunker a few hundred metres away, but nonetheless suffered burn injuries.

Casualties
The exact death toll of the explosion is not known.  The first Western reporting of the accident via the Italian Continentale News Agency in December 1960 said that 100 people were killed, while The Guardian reported in 1965, citing information from spy Oleg Penkovsky who had passed information to the West, that as many as 300 had died.  The Soviet Union said only that a "significant number" had died when it first acknowledged the incident in a 1989 Ogoniok article,  but later in the year, the government put the number of dead at 54.  The most recent estimated death toll, released by Roscosmos on the 50th anniversary of the accident and originating with agency engineer Boris Chertok, was that 126 people had died, but the agency qualified the number by saying that the actual number could be anywhere from 60 to 150 dead.

Aftermath 

Complete secrecy was immediately imposed on the events of 24 October 1960 by Nikita Khrushchev. A news release stated that Nedelin had died in a plane crash and the families of the other engineers were advised to say their loved ones had died of the same cause. Khrushchev also ordered Leonid Brezhnev to head an investigation commission and go to the site. Among other things, the commission found that many more people were present on the launch pad than should have been—most were supposed to be safely offsite in bunkers.

When Brezhnev arrived at the firing range on 25 October 1960, he said: "Comrades! We do not intend to put anyone on trial; we are going to investigate the causes and take actions to recover from the disaster and continue operations". Despite this, I. A. Doroshenko was held accountable for the event.

Afterwards, when Nikita Khrushchev asked Yangel, "But why have you remained alive?", Yangel answered in a trembling voice, "Walked away for a smoke. It's all my fault". Yangel later suffered a heart attack and was off work for months.

After the committee presented its report, the R-16 program resumed in January 1961 with first successful flight on 2 February 1961. The delay to the R-16 spurred the USSR toward the development of more effective ICBMs and sparked Khrushchev's decision to install Intermediate-range ballistic missile (IRBM)s in Cuba. Before the disaster Yangel had ambitions to challenge Sergei Korolev as leader of the Manned Space program, but he was directed to focus on the R-16.

A memorial to the victims of the test was erected in the first half of the 1960s in the Park of Baikonur and is still visited by RKA officials before any manned launch.

Another fatal accident, with the R-9 missile, occurred at Baikonur exactly three years after the Nedelin catastrophe, causing 24 October to be referred to as Baikonur's "Black Day." No launches have been attempted on that date at Baikonur ever since.

Official acknowledgment 
A news release stated that Nedelin had died "in a plane crash while on an undisclosed mission". The Italian news agency Continentale first reported on 8 December 1960, from undisclosed sources, that Marshal Nedelin and 100 people had been killed in a rocket explosion. The Guardian reported on 16 October 1965 that captured spy Oleg Penkovsky had confirmed details of the missile accident, and exiled scientist and Soviet dissident Zhores Medvedev provided further details in 1976 in the British weekly magazine New Scientist. However, it was not until 16 April 1989 that the Soviet Union acknowledged the events, with a report appearing in the weekly newsmagazine Ogoniok.

See also 

 1980 Damascus Titan missile explosion 
 1980 Plesetsk launch pad disaster 
 Intelsat 7081996 launch failure, which killed an unknown number of people in the worst space launch disaster since Nedelin

General bibliography 
 Chertok, Boris; Rockets and People: Fili-Podlipki-Tyuratam; Moscow, 1996; published by Mashinostroyeniye Publishing House (in Russian)
 Chertok, Boris; Rockets and People, Volume 2: Creating a Rocket Industry, 2006; published by NASA 
 Eliseev, V. I. M. We grew hearts in Baikonur. OAO MPK in 2018; 
 Harford, James; Korolev – How One Man Masterminded the Soviet Drive to Beat America to the Moon; John Wiley & Sons, Inc.; New York, 1997; pp. 119–120 
 «At risk» – A. A. Toul, Kaluga, "the Golden path", 2001. 
 Khrushchev, Sergei; Nikita Khrushchev and the Creation of a Superpower; Pennsylvania State University Press, Pennsylvania, 2000; Translated by Shirley Benson; pp. 416–425
 Kuznetsk, M. I. Baikonur. Korolev. Yangel. Voronezh: IPF "Voronezh" 1997; 
 Ostashev, A. I. "Testing of rocket and space technology – the business of my life"; Korolyov, 2001. Events and facts.
 Sheehan, Neil; A Fiery Peace in a Cold War; Random House; New York City, 2009; p. 405.

Citations

External links 
 Nedelin Disaster on RussianSpaceWeb.com
 Nedelin Disaster on aerospaceweb.org
 "The Nedelin Catastrophe"—article from Air & Space Magazine
 Video clip
 Day when not start missiles. Part one
  Day when not start missiles. Part two
 Memorial
 "The disaster at Baikonur", Moskovsky Komsomolets  
 The Russian Union of Veterans, Day of memory and grief.  
 The official website of the city administration Baikonur, Baikonur commemorated a test rocket and space technology. 

1960 in the Soviet Union
Baikonur Cosmodrome
Explosions in Kazakhstan
Disasters in the Soviet Union
Non-combat military accidents
October 1960 events in Asia
Soviet cover-ups
Space accidents and incidents in the Soviet Union
Nedelin Disaster (1960)
Space program of the Soviet Union
Explosions in 1960
1960 disasters in the Soviet Union